A computer museum is devoted to the study of historic computer hardware and software, where a "museum" is a "permanent institution in the service of society and of its development, open to the public, which acquires, conserves, researches, communicates, and exhibits the tangible and intangible heritage of humanity and its environment, for the purposes of education, study, and enjoyment", as defined by the International Council of Museums.

Some computer museums exist within larger institutions, such as the Science Museum in London, United Kingdom; and the Deutsches Museum in Munich, Germany. Others are dedicated specifically to computing, such as: 
 the Computer History Museum in Mountain View, California, United States.
 the American Computer & Robotics Museum in Bozeman, Montana, United States.
 The National Museum of Computing at Bletchley Park, United Kingdom.
 The Centre for Computing History in Cambridge, United Kingdom
 the Nexon Computer Museum in Jeju Province. South Korea.

Some specialize in the early history of computing, others in the era that started with the first personal computers such as the Apple I and Altair 8800, Apple IIs, older Apple Macintoshes, Commodore Internationals, Amigas, IBM PCs and more rare computers such as the Osborne 1. Others Some concentrate more on research and conservation, others more on education and entertainment. There are also private collections, most of which can be visited by appointment.

See also
List of computer museums
List of science museums
Computer Conservation Society (UK)
History of computer hardware
IT History Society
KansasFest annual event for Apple II computer enthusiasts. Held every July at Rockhurst University, Kansas City, Missouri.
Retrocomputing
Vintage Computer Festival held annually in Mountain View, California, and elsewhere
Technology museum

Further reading
Bell, Gordon (2011). Out of a Closet: The Early Years of the Computer Museums. Microsoft Technical Report MSR-TR-2011-44.
Bruemmer, Bruce H. (1987). Resources for the History of Computing: A Guide to U.S. & Canadian Records. Charles Babbage Institute.
Cortada, James W. (1990). Archives of Data-Processing History: A Guide to Major U.S. Collections. Greenwood

References

 
Types of museums